The expander mixing lemma intuitively states that the edges of certain -regular graphs are evenly distributed throughout the graph.

d-Regular Expander Graphs 

If we fix  and  then -graphs form a family of expander graphs with a constant spectral gap.

Statement
Let  be an -graph.  For any two subsets , let  be the number of edges between S and T (counting edges contained in the intersection of S and T twice). Then

Tighter Bound 
We can in fact show that

using similar techniques.

Biregular Graphs 
For biregular graphs, we have the following variation, where we take  to be the second largest eigenvalue.

Let . Then
 

Proofs

Proof of First Statement 
We know that  with corresponding eigenvector , the normalization of the all-1's vector. Define  and note that .

Let  be the  matrix of all 1's. For a vertex subset , let  be the column vector with  coordinate equal to 1 if  and 0 otherwise. Then,

.

Let . By the Cauchy-Schwarz inequality, we have that . Furthermore, because  is self-adjoint, we can write

.

Proof Sketch of Tighter Bound 
We can expand

because the other two terms of the expansion are zero.

We can bound the right hand side by  using the same methods as in the earlier proof.

Applications

The expander mixing lemma can be used to upper bound the size of an independent set within a graph. In particular, the size of an independent set in an -graph is at most  This is proved by letting  in the statement above and using the fact that 

An additional consequence is that, if  is an -graph, then its chromatic number  is at least  This is because, in a valid graph coloring, the set of vertices of a given color is an independent set. By the above fact, each independent set has size at most  so at least  such sets are needed to cover all of the vertices.

A second application of the expander mixing lemma is to provide an upper bound on the maximum possible size of an independent set within a polarity graph.

Converse
Bilu and Linial showed that a converse holds as well: if a -regular graph  satisfies that for any two subsets  with  we have

Generalization to hypergraphs

Friedman and Widgerson proved the following generalization of the mixing lemma to hypergraphs.

Let  be a -uniform hypergraph, i.e. a hypergraph in which every "edge" is a tuple of  vertices. For any choice of subsets  of vertices,

Notes

References

.

.

.

.

Theoretical computer science
Lemmas in graph theory